German submarine U-878 was a Type IXC/40 U-boat built for Nazi Germany's Kriegsmarine during World War II.

Design
German Type IXC/40 submarines were slightly larger than the original Type IXCs. U-878 had a displacement of  when at the surface and  while submerged. She had two shafts and two  propellers.

U-878 was fitted with six  torpedo tubes (four fitted at the bow and two at the stern), 22 torpedoes, one  SK C/32 naval gun, 180 rounds, and a  Flak M42 as well as two twin  C/30 anti-aircraft guns. The boat had a complement of forty-eight.

Service history
U-878 was ordered on 2 April 1942 from DeSchiMAG AG Weser in Bremen under the yard number 1086. Her keel was laid down on 16 June 1943 and the U-boat was launched the following year on 6 January 1944. She was commissioned into service under the command of Kapitänleutnant Johannes Rodig (Crew 36) in 4th U-boat Flotilla.

After completing training and work up for deployment, U-878 was transferred to the 33rd U-boat Flotilla. Her first war patrol was a supply run for the beleaguered U-boat base of St. Nazaire. The U-boat left Horten Naval Base on 9 February 1945 and arrived at her destination on 20 March. On the return leg, she was picked up by escorts of convoy ONA 265 on 10 April 1945.  and  attacked U-878 with depth charges and squid mortar. U-878 was sunk in position , all 51 crew members were lost.

References

Bibliography

External links

World War II submarines of Germany
German Type IX submarines
1944 ships
U-boats commissioned in 1944
U-boats sunk in 1945
U-boats sunk by British warships
U-boats sunk by depth charges
Ships built in Bremen (state)
Maritime incidents in April 1945